The John W. Ballard House is a historic building located in central Davenport, Iowa, United States. It has been listed on the National Register of Historic Places since 1983.

History
John W. Ballard began living here in 1884, so he was probably not the person who had the house built. Ballard and his cousin, E.S. Ballord were partners in a pharmacy named E.S. Ballord & Co. In 1903 E.S. retired and John Ballard and his son continued the business as Ballard Drug & Dental Co.

Architecture
Built in 1871, the home is one of the oldest surviving buildings in Davenport's upper Main Street area—if not the oldest. A Victorian Greek Revival design with turn-of-the-century neoclassical modifications, the house was reportedly "the most commanding structure in the neighborhood" at the time of construction. The main façade of the house faces a large yard to the south. It originally featured a single-story projecting window bay beside the main entrance. Sometime between 1892 and 1910 a two-story semi-circular bay and a porch that followed the bay was added. The two-story house is composed of brick and sits on a stone foundation. The addition is composed of wood construction.

References

External links

Houses completed in 1871
Victorian architecture in Iowa
Houses in Davenport, Iowa
Houses on the National Register of Historic Places in Iowa
National Register of Historic Places in Davenport, Iowa